Clachaig; is a small settlement, on the Cowal peninsula in Argyll and Bute, Scotland. It is located on the B836 road between the Holy Loch and Loch Striven, the hamlet is just over a mile long.  Clachaig is a Gaelic word meaning 'stone place'.

The Hamlet consists of twenty-two houses and was built for accommodation for the workers of the powder mill. The mill manufactured gunpowder.

The river at the bottom of the glen is the Blackcraig Burn that joins the Little Eachaig River, then joining the River Eachaig and flowing into the Holy Loch.

Gallery

References

External links

Villages in Cowal
Highlands and Islands of Scotland